12th CFCA Awards
March 13, 2000

Best Film: 
 American Beauty 
The 12th Chicago Film Critics Association Awards, given on 13 March 2000, honored the finest achievements in 1999 filmmaking.

Winners
Best Actor: 
Kevin Spacey - American Beauty
Best Actress: 
Hilary Swank - Boys Don't Cry
Best Cinematography: 
Snow Falling on Cedars - Robert Richardson
Best Director: 
Sam Mendes - American Beauty
Best Film: 
American Beauty
Best Foreign Language Film: 
Todo sobre mi madre (All About My Mother), Spain
Best Score: 
"South Park: Bigger, Longer & Uncut"- Trey Parker and Marc Shaiman
Best Screenplay: 
Being John Malkovich - Charlie Kaufman
Best Supporting Actor: 
Tom Cruise - Magnolia
Best Supporting Actress: 
Chloë Sevigny - Boys Don't Cry
Most Promising Actor: 
Wes Bentley - American Beauty
Most Promising Actress (tie): 
Émilie Dequenne - Rosetta
Julia Stiles - 10 Things I Hate About You

References
https://web.archive.org/web/20120515203059/http://www.chicagofilmcritics.org/index.php?option=com_content&view=article&id=48&Itemid=58

 1999
1999 film awards